Limansky District is an administrative and municipal district (raion), one of the eleven in Astrakhan Oblast, Russia. It is located in the southwest of the oblast. Its administrative center is the urban locality (a work settlement) of Liman. As of the 2010 Census, the total population of the district was 31,952, with the population of Liman accounting for 28.2% of that number.

References

Notes

Sources

Districts of Astrakhan Oblast